Stockrange is a ghost town in Smoky Hill Township, Ellis County, Kansas, United States.

History
Stockrange was issued a post office in 1883. The post office was discontinued in 1895. Stockrange was reformed in Trego County with a post office from 1900 to 1908.

References

Further reading

External links
 Ellis County maps: Current, Historic, KDOT

Former populated places in Ellis County, Kansas
Former populated places in Trego County, Kansas
Former populated places in Kansas